U.S. Route 76 (US 76) is an east–west U.S. highway in the U.S. state of South Carolina. Being one of the longest and most important highways in the state, it connects the cities of Anderson, Columbia, Sumter and Florence.

Route description

US 76 enters South Carolina across the Chattooga River, then continues southeast toward Westminster. This segment is a moderately windy two-lane road. In Westminster, it heads east toward Seneca and Clemson. From Clemson, the road heads southeast toward Anderson, intersecting Interstate 85 (I-85), then east toward the small towns of Belton and Honea Path. US 76 is a four-lane highway from Westminster to Anderson. In Anderson, the road widens to six lanes with a reversible turn lane. After a concurrency with US 178, the road narrows to five lanes, and, as it goes south towards downtown Anderson, it narrows againk to four. However, the sections around Seneca, Clemson, and Anderson are well developed with many traffic lights. It travels concurrent with US 123 from Westminster to Clemson, SC 28 from Seneca to Anderson, and US 178 from Anderson to Honea Path.

From Honea Path, the highway heads east to Laurens. This section is a rural two-lane road that is not frequently traveled. From Laurens, US 76 roughly parallels I-385 and I-26 as it heads to Columbia. US 76 provides local access to the communities of Laurens, Clinton, Newberry, Prosperity, Chapin, and the other smaller towns in the area. In Irmo, US 76 travels concurrent with US 176, then continues on to I-26, with which it travels concurrent. After the interchange with I-20, US 76 splits off from I-26 and continues into downtown Columbia concurrent with I-126.

In Columbia, US 76 follows Elmwood Avenue, Bull Street, Gervais Street, Millwood Avenue, and Devine Street, before heading east toward Sumter. The segment from Columbia to Sumter is a four-lane highway and US 76 is concurrent with US 378 from the intersection of Bull and Gervais near the University of South Carolina in Columbia all the way to Sumter. From Sumter, US 76 heads northeast to Florence. US  76 is the major road through Florence. It then continues east out of Florence to the small towns of Marion and Mullins, then into North Carolina. The highway is concurrent with US 301 from Florence to across the Pee Dee River.

History

Formerly, US 76 followed a longer route from Westminster to Pendleton. From Westminster, the old route followed S-37-13 through the Richland community, then its current alignment to SC 59 into downtown Seneca, then SC 130 out of Seneca to S-37-1, then its current alignment to SC 93 toward Clemson University, then SC 28 Business through Pendleton.

Major intersections

See also
 
 
Special routes of U.S. Route 76

References

External links

 
76
Transportation in Oconee County, South Carolina
Transportation in Pickens County, South Carolina
Transportation in Anderson County, South Carolina
Transportation in Greenville County, South Carolina
Transportation in Laurens County, South Carolina
Transportation in Newberry County, South Carolina
Transportation in Lexington County, South Carolina
Transportation in Richland County, South Carolina
Transportation in Sumter County, South Carolina
Transportation in Florence County, South Carolina
Transportation in Marion County, South Carolina
Transportation in Horry County, South Carolina
Anderson, South Carolina
Newberry, South Carolina
Transportation in Columbia, South Carolina
Sumter, South Carolina
Florence, South Carolina metropolitan area